Juan Antonio de Urbiztondo y Eguía (7 January 1803, San Sebastián – 26 April 1857, Madrid) was a Spanish military and the marquis of La Solana. In 1814 he became a knight's page in the Spanish Army, fought against the government of Trienio Liberal, and then became the inspector of the Voluntarios Realistas. Madrid historians mentioned Urbiztondo's participation to a dispute at the Royal Palace of Madrid, which involved the Duke of Cádiz, the Duke of Valencia and Joaquín Osorio y Silva-Bazán (who was killed by Urbiztondo).

In 1833 he was imprisoned at Mérida due to the accusation that he is supposed-to-be connection to Carlism, but he managed to escape to Portugal.

1803 births
1857 deaths
Captains General of the Philippines